The 1888 Amherst football team represented the Amherst University as a member of the Eastern Intercollegiate Football Association (EIFA) during the 1888 college football season. Amherst compiled an overall record of 2–8–1 with a mark of 0–3 in EIFA play.

Schedule

References

Amherst
Amherst Mammoths football seasons
Amherst football